Tytroca is a genus of moths in the family Erebidae.

Species
Tytroca alabuensis Wiltshire, 1970
Tytroca dispar (Püngeler, 1904)
Tytroca fasciolata Warren and Rothschild, 1905
Tytroca leucoptera (Hampson, 1896)
Tytroca metaxantha (Hampson, 1902)

References
Natural History Museum Lepidoptera genus database

Ophiusini
Moth genera